Emesvirus is a genus of positive-strand RNA viruses, in the family Fiersviridae. Enterobacteria serve as natural hosts. There are three species in this genus. In 2020, the genus was renamed from Levivirus to its current name.

Structure
Viruses in Emesvirus are non-enveloped, with icosahedral and  Spherical geometries, and T=3 symmetry. The capsid diameter is around 26 nm.

Genome 
Emesviruses have a positive-sense, single-stranded RNA genome. The genome is linear and non-segmented and around 3.5kb in length. The genome codes for four proteins, which are the coat, replicase, maturation, and lysis protein.

Life cycle
Entry into the host cell is achieved by adsorption into the host cell. Replication follows the positive-strand RNA virus replication model. Positive-strand RNA virus transcription is the method of transcription. Translation takes place by suppression of termination. The virus exits the host cell by bacteria lysis. Enterobacteria serve as the natural host.

Taxonomy
The genus Emesvirus has the following two species:

 Emesvirus japonicum
 Emesvirus piscicola
 Emesvirus zinderi, commonly called bacteriophage MS2

References

External links
 Viralzone: Levivirus
 ICTV

Virus genera
Fiersviridae